Curry, Alabama may refer to the following unincorporated communities in Alabama:
Curry, Pike County, Alabama
Curry, Talladega County, Alabama
Curry, Walker County, Alabama